Sanjay Uikey is an Indian politician and a member of the Indian National Congress party. He is currently the MLA of Baihar Vidhansabha from the Madhya Pradesh legislative assembly. He is the son of Late Ganpat Singh Uikey who was formerly Cabinet Minister in the Madhya Pradesh legislative assembly and four times MLA from Baihar.

Political career 
He became an MLA in 2013 Madhya Pradesh Legislative Assembly election. Before that he was the Chairman of Malanjkhand Municipality (Malanjkhand Nagar Palika).

Personal life 
He is married to Urmila Uikey and has two daughters.

See also 
 Madhya Pradesh Legislative Assembly
 2013 Madhya Pradesh Legislative Assembly election

References

External links 

Madhya Pradesh MLAs 2013–2018
Madhya Pradesh MLAs 2018–2023
Indian National Congress politicians from Madhya Pradesh
Living people
1968 births